Pedro Astudillo (born December 1, 1963) is an American singer and songwriter. He was a backup vocalist for Selena y Los Dinos and has released several albums as a solo artist.

Early life
Astudillo was born on December 1, 1963, in Laredo, Texas, to Pedro and Paz Astudillo. He was one of the leaders of the Tejano music scene, and from an early age followed mariachi and conjunto music. He began his musical career in a duo band called Los Bad Boyz alongside his friend Joe Ojeda in their hometown Laredo in 1985. In 1987, they were brought into a band, Selena y Los Dinos, by its manager, Abraham Quintanilla Jr., after opening a show for Los Dinos at a disco in Laredo. Astudillo became a backup vocalist for the Queen of Tejano, Selena, the lead member of the group. Astudillo also sang three duets with her — "Amame, Quiereme" (1989), “Yo Te Amo” (1990) and "Siempre Estoy Pensando en Ti" (1992) - two of which were nominated for Vocal Duo of the Year at the Tejano Music Awards. He co-wrote some of Selena's number one hits such as "Bidi Bidi Bom Bom", "Amor Prohibido", and the BMI award-winners "La Carcacha", "¿Qué Creías?", and "Como la Flor." Astudillo also wrote the song "Estúpido Romántico" that was sung and made popular by Grupo Mazz.

As his collaboration with Selena flourished, Astudillo developed as a solo artist as well. In 1992, his debut album Entregate a Mi, which included six songs written by him, was released on EMI Latin. 1993 also saw Astudillo nominated for Male Vocalist and Best Single at the Tejano Music Awards. Also in 1993, he released his next album entitled Como Nadie. This album also had the same winning formula. He left Selena y Los Dinos in 1993, but continued to write Selena's songs, particularly for her fourth studio album, Amor Prohibido.

In 1995 after Selena's murder, by which Pete was devastated, he released his third album Cómo te Extraño, which included his Lo Nuestro award-winning song by the same name. This song was dedicated to Selena, as well as his mother, Paz Astudillo, who died the previous year. Astudillo is most well known for this song, which he co-wrote with A.B. Quintanilla, Selena's older brother.

In 1997, Warner Bros. released the biopic film, Selena, telling her life story. Astudillo played himself in the movie. During this same year, Astudillo released his fourth album entitled Si Tu No Estas featuring the single by the album name. In 1999, he released his fifth and last studio album to date, Donde Estas Amor.

In 2003, Astudillo made an appearance at the 11th Annual El Premio ASCAP Awards, where he expressed that even though he did not win any awards, he was there to show support for the people who did.

In 2005, his Greatest Hits album was released under the Univision label. He re-united with the original Dinos from Selena y Los Dinos for a historic massive tribute concert in honor of the slain superstar, on April 7, 2005, at the Reliant Stadium in Houston, Texas. They performed "Como La Flor," as sung by Selena in her famed 1995 Astrodome concert, which over 64,000 fans attended. In 2020, Netflix released Selena: The Series, Astudillo was played by actor Julio Macias.

References

External links
 "Pete Astudillo", BMI
 "Pete Astudillo arrestado "

1963 births
American people of Mexican descent
People from Laredo, Texas
Selena y Los Dinos members
Songwriters from Texas
Tejano musicians
Living people
Hispanic and Latino American musicians
American musicians of Mexican descent
Singers from Texas
20th-century American singers
Hispanic and Latino American people
People from Webb County, Texas
People from Texas
20th-century American male musicians
21st-century American male singers
21st-century American singers
21st-century American musicians
20th-century American male singers
20th-century American musicians
21st-century American male musicians
EMI Latin artists
Latin pop musicians
Latin music songwriters
Pete Astudillo